The following is an alphabetical list of articles related to the U.S. state of Rhode Island.

0–9

.ri.us – Internet second-level domain for the state of Rhode Island
13th state to ratify the Constitution of the United States of America

A
Adjacent states:

Airports in Rhode Island
Arboreta in Rhode Island
commons:Category:Arboreta in Rhode Island
Archaeology in Rhode Island
:Category:Archaeological sites in Rhode Island
commons:Category:Archaeological sites in Rhode Island
Area codes in Rhode Island
Arnold, Benedict
Art museums and galleries in Rhode Island
commons:Category:Art museums and galleries in Rhode Island
Astronomical observatories in Rhode Island
commons:Category:Astronomical observatories in Rhode Island

B
Beaches of Rhode Island
commons:Category:Beaches of Rhode Island
Boston-Worcester-Manchester, MA-RI-NH Combined Statistical Area
Botanical gardens in Rhode Island
commons:Category:Botanical gardens in Rhode Island
Buildings and structures in Rhode Island
commons:Category:Buildings and structures in Rhode Island

C

Capital of the State of Rhode Island
Capitol of the State of Rhode Island
commons:Category:Rhode Island State Capitol
Census statistical areas of Rhode Island
Cities in Rhode Island
commons:Category:Cities in Rhode Island

Climate of Rhode Island
Colleges and universities in Rhode Island
commons:Category:Universities and colleges in Rhode Island
Colony of Rhode Island and Providence Plantations
Communications in Rhode Island
commons:Category:Communications in Rhode Island
Congressional districts of Rhode Island
Rhode Island Convention Center
commons:Category:Convention centers in Rhode Island
Counties of the State of Rhode Island
commons:Category:Counties in Rhode Island
Culture of Rhode Island
:Category:Rhode Island culture
commons:Category:Rhode Island culture

D
Demographics of Rhode Island

E
Economy of Rhode Island
:Category:Economy of Rhode Island
commons:Category:Economy of Rhode Island
Education in Rhode Island
:Category:Education in Rhode Island
commons:Category:Education in Rhode Island
Elections in the State of Rhode Island
commons:Category:Rhode Island elections
Environment of Rhode Island
commons:Category:Environment of Rhode Island

F

Festivals in Rhode Island
commons:Category:Festivals in Rhode Island
Flag of the State of Rhode Island
Fort Thunder
Forts in Rhode Island
:Category:Forts in Rhode Island
commons:Category:Forts in Rhode Island

G

Gamm Theatre
Gardens in Rhode Island
commons:Category:Gardens in Rhode Island
Geography of Rhode Island
:Category:Geography of Rhode Island
commons:Category:Geography of Rhode Island
Geology of Rhode Island
commons:Category:Geology of Rhode Island
Ghost towns in Rhode Island
:Category:Ghost towns in Rhode Island
commons:Category:Ghost towns in Rhode Island
Golf clubs and courses in Rhode Island
commons:Category:Ghost towns in Rhode Island
Government of the State of Rhode Island website
:Category:Government of Rhode Island
commons:Category:Government of Rhode Island
Governor of the State of Rhode Island
List of governors of Rhode Island
Great Seal of the State of Rhode Island

H
Rhode Island Heritage Hall of Fame
Heritage railroads in Rhode Island
commons:Category:Heritage railroads in Rhode Island
High schools of Rhode Island
Higher education in Rhode Island
Highway routes in Rhode Island
Hiking trails in Rhode Island
commons:Category:Hiking trails in Rhode Island
History of Rhode Island
Historical outline of Rhode Island
Hospitals in Rhode Island
House of Representatives of the State of Rhode Island

I
Images of Rhode Island
commons:Category:Rhode Island
Islands of Rhode Island

J

K

L
Lakes of Rhode Island
commons:Category:Lakes of Rhode Island
Landmarks in Rhode Island
commons:Category:Landmarks in Rhode Island
Lieutenant Governor of the State of Rhode Island
Lists related to the State of Rhode Island:
List of airports in Rhode Island
List of census statistical areas in Rhode Island
List of cities in Rhode Island
List of colleges and universities in Rhode Island
List of counties in Rhode Island
List of forts in Rhode Island
List of ghost towns in Rhode Island
List of governors of Rhode Island
List of high schools in Rhode Island
List of highway routes in Rhode Island
List of hospitals in Rhode Island
List of islands of Rhode Island
List of law enforcement agencies in Rhode Island
List of lieutenant governors of Rhode Island
List of museums in Rhode Island
List of National Historic Landmarks in Rhode Island
List of newspapers in Rhode Island
List of people from Rhode Island
List of radio stations in Rhode Island
List of railroads in Rhode Island
List of Registered Historic Places in Rhode Island
List of Rhode Island companies
List of rivers of Rhode Island
List of school districts in Rhode Island
List of state forests in Rhode Island
List of state parks in Rhode Island
List of state prisons in Rhode Island
List of symbols of the State of Rhode Island
List of telephone area codes in Rhode Island
List of television stations in Rhode Island
List of towns in Rhode Island
List of United States congressional delegations from Rhode Island
List of United States congressional districts in Rhode Island
List of United States representatives from Rhode Island
List of United States senators from Rhode Island

M
Maps of Rhode Island
commons:Category:Maps of Rhode Island
Mass media in Rhode Island
Museums in Rhode Island
:Category:Museums in Rhode Island
commons:Category:Museums in Rhode Island
Music of Rhode Island
commons:Category:Music of Rhode Island
:Category:Musical groups from Rhode Island
:Category:Musicians from Rhode Island

N
Natural history of Rhode Island
commons:Category:Natural history of Rhode Island
New England
Newport, Rhode Island, co-capital of the State of Rhode Island 1776-1900
Newport Folk Festival
Newport Jazz Festival
Newspapers of Rhode Island

O

P
People from Rhode Island
:Category:People from Rhode Island
commons:Category:People from Rhode Island
:Category:People by city in Rhode Island
:Category:People by county in Rhode Island
:Category:People from Rhode Island by occupation
Politics of Rhode Island
Political party strength in Rhode Island
commons:Category:Politics of Rhode Island
Portal:Rhode Island
Portsmouth, capital of the Colony of Aquidneck Island 1639–1644, capital of the Colony of Rhode Island 1644-1663
Protected areas of Rhode Island
commons:Category:Protected areas of Rhode Island
Providence, capital of the Colony of Providence 1636–1663, capital of the Colony of Rhode Island and Providence Plantations 1663-1686 and 1689–1776, co-capital of the State of Rhode Island and Providence Plantations 1776–1900, and sole state capital since 1900.

Q

R
Radio stations in Rhode Island
Railroads in Rhode Island
Registered historic places in Rhode Island
commons:Category:Registered Historic Places in Rhode Island
Religion in Rhode Island
:Category:Religion in Rhode Island
commons:Category:Religion in Rhode Island
Rhode Island Department of Administration
Rhode Island Philosophical Society
RI – United States Postal Service postal code for the State of Rhode Island
Rivers of Rhode Island
commons:Category:Rivers of Rhode Island

Rhode Island website
:Category:Rhode Island
commons:Category:Rhode Island
commons:Category:Maps of Rhode Island
Rhode Island State House
Rhode Island State Police

S
School districts of Rhode Island
Scouting in Rhode Island
Senate of the State of Rhode Island
Settlements in Rhode Island
Cities in Rhode Island
Towns in Rhode Island
Villages in Rhode Island
Census Designated Places in Rhode Island
Other unincorporated communities in Rhode Island
List of ghost towns in Rhode Island
Size of Rhode Island
Ski areas and resorts in Rhode Island
commons:Category:Ski areas and resorts in Rhode Island
Sports in Rhode Island
:Category:Sports in Rhode Island
commons:Category:Sports in Rhode Island
:Category:Sports venues in Rhode Island
commons:Category:Sports venues in Rhode Island
State of Rhode Island website
Government of the State of Rhode Island
:Category:Government of Rhode Island
commons:Category:Government of Rhode Island
Executive branch of the government of the State of Rhode Island
Governor of the State of Rhode Island
Legislative branch of the government of the State of Rhode Island
Legislature of the State of Rhode Island
Senate of the State of Rhode Island
House of Representatives of the State of Rhode Island
Judicial branch of the government of the State of Rhode Island
Supreme Court of the State of Rhode Island
State parks of Rhode Island
commons:Category:State parks of Rhode Island
State Police of Rhode Island
State prisons of Rhode Island
Structures in Rhode Island
commons:Category:Buildings and structures in Rhode Island
Supreme Court of the State of Rhode Island
Symbols of the State of Rhode Island
:Category:Symbols of Rhode Island
commons:Category:Symbols of Rhode Island

T
Telecommunications in Rhode Island
commons:Category:Communications in Rhode Island
Telephone area codes in Rhode Island
Television shows set in Rhode Island
Television stations in Rhode Island
Theatres in Rhode Island
commons:Category:Theatres in Rhode Island
Tourism in Rhode Island website
commons:Category:Tourism in Rhode Island
Towns in Rhode Island
commons:Category:Cities in Rhode Island
Transportation in Rhode Island
:Category:Transportation in Rhode Island
commons:Category:Transport in Rhode Island
Trinity Repertory Company

U
United States of America
States of the United States of America
United States census statistical areas of Rhode Island
United States congressional delegations from Rhode Island
United States congressional districts in Rhode Island
United States Court of Appeals for the First Circuit
United States District Court for the District of Rhode Island
United States representatives from Rhode Island
United States senators from Rhode Island
Universities and colleges in Rhode Island
commons:Category:Universities and colleges in Rhode Island
US-RI – ISO 3166-2:US region code for the State of Rhode Island

V

W
Waterfalls of Rhode Island
commons:Category:Waterfalls of Rhode Island
WaterFire Providence
Weybosset
Wikimedia
Wikimedia Commons:Category:Rhode Island
commons:Category:Maps of Rhode Island
Wikinews:Category:Rhode Island
Wikinews:Portal:Rhode Island
Wikipedia Category:Rhode Island
Wikipedia Portal:Rhode Island
Wikipedia:WikiProject Rhode Island
:Category:WikiProject Rhode Island articles
:Category:WikiProject Rhode Island members

X

Y

Z
Zoos in Rhode Island
commons:Category:Zoos in Rhode Island

See also

Topic overview:
Rhode Island
Outline of Rhode Island

Rhode Island
 
Rhode Island